Norma Kathleen Hemming (born September 1928 in Ilford, Essex, London, England – d. 4 July 1960 in Melbourne, Australia) was a British-Australian writer of science fiction and romance novels. She was Australia's first significant female science fiction writer. As N. K. Hemming published twenty stories in the 1950s, and also wrote and appeared in a series of plays that were performed at Australian science fiction conventions. Under the name Nerina Hilliard, she also wrote 8 romance novels for Mills & Boon. She is now commemorated by the Australian Science Fiction Foundation through the Norma K. Hemming Award, inaugurated at the World Science Fiction Convention in Melbourne in September 2010.

Biography
Norma Kathleen Hemming was born in Ilford, Essex, in September 1928. After attending a girls' school, she trained as a secretary. In October 1948, she emigrated to Sydney on the SS Orontes, with her parents and younger brother.

She published her first science fiction story, "Loser Takes All", in the British magazine Science Fantasy in 1951. Over the next eight years, she published a further nineteen stories, many in the Australian pulp magazine Thrills Incorporated, and others in leading British magazines such as New Worlds, Nebula SF, and Science Fiction Adventures.

She also became involved in the Sydney fan scene. She was one of the first female members of the Sydney Futurian Society, joining after the inaugural Australian science fiction convention in 1952. She was a contributor to and editor of Vertical Horizons, a fanzine specifically aimed at female science fiction fans. She wrote and performed in a series of plays performed at national fan conventions between 1954 and 1958.

By the later 1950s she had also turned to writing romance novels, under the pseudonym Nerina Hilliard. Her first romance novel, The Time is Short, was published by Mills & Boon in 1958. Another two novels appeared in 1960, and five more were published posthumously.

By the late 1950s she was suffering from breast cancer, which spread to her bones and lymph nodes. She died in the Peter MacCallum Clinic in Melbourne on 4 July 1960, at the age of 31.

Her themes include mutual attraction between earth women and male aliens, children with unearthly powers, Amazons in outer space, and planets ruled by matriarchies. Her tone is often light and humorous.

Her achievements are commemorated by the Norma K. Hemming Award, established by the Australian Science Fiction Foundation to mark excellence in the exploration of themes of race, gender, class and sexuality by an Australian writer. The Award was launched at the 68th World Science Fiction Convention (Aussiecon Four) in Melbourne in September 2010.

A collection of archival material relating to Norma Hemming, including several of her letters, is held in the Special Collections in the University of Western Australia Library.

Bibliography

As N. K. Hemming
Science Fantasy: Volume 1 Number 3 (1951) (with F. G. Rayer, E. C. Tubb, J. T. McIntosh, E. R. James, John Wyndham, and John Carnell)
New Worlds 51: Time Will Tell, Report on Earth, Conviction, Mutation, Dwellers in Silence, Creep (1956) (with Lan Wright, Kenneth Johns, and E. R. James
New Worlds Science Fiction: Volume 17 Number 51 (1956) (with Lan Wright and Brian W. Aldiss)
Nebula Science Fiction: Number 33: Talk Not at All, Way Out, Mute Witness, Debt of Lassor, Conflagration, Wisdom of the Gods (1958) (With Stuart Allen, Clifford C. Reed, and Robert Lloyd)
Science Fiction Adventures: Volume 2 Number 10 (1959) (with E. C. Tubb, and Calvin M. Knox)

As Nerina Hilliard
Time is Short (1958) (later re-issued as Nurse Carol's Secret)
The House of Adriano (1960)
Scars Shall Fade (1960)
Teachers Must Learn (1968)
Dark Star (1969)
Dark Intruder (1975)
Land of the Sun (1976)
Sister to Meryl (1977)

Notes

Further reading
 Burrows, Toby, "Coming down to earth: Norma Hemming turns from SF to romance", in Telling Stories: Australian Life and Literature 1935-2012, edited by Tanya Dalziell and Paul Genoni (Clayton, Vic.: Monash University Publishing, 2013), pp. 202–208
 McMullen, Sean, & Russell Blackford, "Prophet and Pioneer: the Science Fiction of Norma Hemming", Fantasy Annual No. 2 (Spring 1998), 65–75.
 Medlen, David, "I Wasn't Expecting That: the Career of Norma Hemming", Science Fiction: a Review of Speculative Literature 17 (1) (2008), 3–17.

External links
 Australian Science Fiction Foundation, Norma K. Hemming Award: https://www.asff.org.au/awards/hemming-award/

1928 births
1960 deaths
Deaths from breast cancer
Australian romantic fiction writers
Australian science fiction writers
Australian women novelists
Women science fiction and fantasy writers
British emigrants to Australia
People from Ilford
Writers from London
Women romantic fiction writers
20th-century British women writers
20th-century English novelists
20th-century pseudonymous writers
Pseudonymous women writers